Parliamentary elections were held in Latvia on 30 September and 1 October 1995. The Democratic Party "Saimnieks" emerged as the largest party in the Saeima, winning 18 of the 100 seats.

Results

Aftermath
Both parties of government, Latvian Way and Latvian Farmers' Union were punished by the voters, losing a substantial number of seats. With no party able to form a working majority, a new government was formed led by independent Andris Šķēle.

References

Parliamentary elections in Latvia
Latvia
1995 in Latvia